Cuthbert Rippon (29 April 1797 – 14 April 1867) was a British politician.

Rippon was the son of a wealthy stockbroker, who bought several estates in County Durham.  Cuthbert lived at Stanhope Castle.

Rippon stood at Gateshead at the 1832 UK general election, and was elected as a Whig.  On the radical wing of the party, he supported three-year parliaments, the abolition of tithes and all monopolies, the removal of bishops from the House of Lords, and of clergy from automatically qualifying as magistrates.

Rippon was re-elected at the 1835 and 1837 UK general elections, and stood down in 1841.

References

1797 births
1867 deaths
Members of the Parliament of the United Kingdom for English constituencies
People from Stanhope, County Durham
UK MPs 1832–1835
UK MPs 1835–1837
UK MPs 1837–1841
Whig (British political party) MPs for English constituencies